The 1893 Brooklyn Grooms finished a disappointing seventh in the National League race under new player/manager Dave Foutz. The highlight of the year was when pitcher Brickyard Kennedy became the first major leaguer to pitch and win two games on the same day since the mound was moved back to 60 feet 6 inches. He allowed just eight hits in beating the Louisville Colonels 3–0 and 6–2 in a doubleheader on May 30, 1893.

Offseason 
 February 5, 1893: John Montgomery Ward was signed as a free agent by the Grooms.
 February 15, 1893: John Montgomery Ward was sold by the Grooms to the New York Giants for $6,000.
 February 18, 1893: Bill Joyce and cash were traded by the Grooms to the Washington Senators for Danny Richardson.

Regular season

Season standings

Record vs. opponents

Roster

Notable transactions 
 July 27, 1893: Willie Keeler was purchased by the Grooms from the New York Giants.

Player stats

Batting

Starters by position 
Note: Pos = Position; G = Games played; AB = At bats; R = Runs; H = Hits; Avg. = Batting average; HR = Home runs; RBI = Runs batted in; SB = Stolen bases

Other batters 
Note: G = Games played; AB = At bats; R = Runs; H = Hits; Avg. = Batting average; HR = Home runs; RBI = Runs batted in; SB = Stolen bases

Pitching

Starting pitchers 
Note: G = Games pitched; GS = Games started; IP = Innings pitched; W = Wins; L = Losses; ERA = Earned run average; BB = Bases on balls; SO = Strikeouts; CG = Complete games

Other pitchers 
Note: G = Games pitched; GS = Games started; IP = Innings pitched; W = Wins; L = Losses; ERA = Earned run average; BB = Bases on balls; SO = Strikeouts; CG = Complete games

Relief pitchers 
Note: G = Games pitched; IP = Innings pitched; W = Wins; L = Losses; SV = Saves; ERA = Earned run average; BB = Bases on balls; SO = Strikeouts

Notes

References 
Baseball-Reference season page
Baseball Almanac season page

External links 
Brooklyn Dodgers reference site
Acme Dodgers page 
Retrosheet

Brooklyn Grooms season
Los Angeles Dodgers seasons
Brooklyn
19th century in Brooklyn
Brownsville, Brooklyn